The Maharashtra I solar park southwest of Chatgaon Village in the Beed district of Maharashtra is a 67.2 megawatt (MWDC) photovoltaic power station, which was commissioned in August 2017.

Part of the plant uses a seasonal tracking system with the remaining using a horizontal single axis tracking system, using polycrystalline solar PV technology. The produced electricity is taken by Maharashtra State Electricity Distribution Company Limited and Solar Energy Corporation of India (SECI). The solar park was constructed using 207,015 solar modules. The estimated reduction of CO2 is more than 41,000 metric tons per year. Solar Arise currently owns and operates 130 MW of grid-connected solar power projects in India.

References

External links
 https://www.thomas-lloyd.com/en/portfolio-item/maharashtra-i/

Photovoltaic power stations in India
Beed district
2017 establishments in Maharashtra
Power stations in Maharashtra